Alejandro Alfaro Ligero (born 23 November 1986) is a Spanish former professional footballer, and current scout of CA Osasuna. Mainly a right winger, he could also operate as a second striker.

Over seven seasons, he appeared in 125 matches in La Liga, totalling 18 goals for Sevilla, Tenerife and Mallorca. In a 15-year senior career, he added 212 appearances and 49 goals in Segunda División.

Club career
A product of Sevilla FC's youth system, Alfaro was one of Sevilla Atlético's most important players from 2005 onwards, helping them achieve promotion to Segunda División in the 2006–07 season. He had previously made his first-team debut on 30 April 2006, playing eight minutes in a 2–1 away win against Real Sociedad.
 
Alfaro scored his first La Liga goal on 28 January 2007, as a starter in a 4–2 away victory over Levante UD, also appearing in four UEFA Cup games in the club's victorious campaign. However, he was nothing more than a fringe player with the main squad in his first three seasons, barred mainly by Jesús Navas (he did net seven times in 34 matches to help the reserves retain their second-division status), and would leave the Andalusians for 2008–09, joining CD Tenerife on loan. During this stint, he was instrumental as the Canary Islands side returned to the top flight after a seven-year-absence by scoring a career-best 20 goals, fourth-best in the competition.

After he completed the 2009 preseason with Sevilla, Alfaro was again loaned for a season to Tenerife. Like Nino, he again was the most important attacking member of the team, who were eventually relegated again while the player contributed seven goals.

Returned to Sevilla for 2010–11, Alfaro benefitted from Navas' absence due to injury and featured in some games early into the season, scoring in a 2–1 defeat of Málaga CF on 19 September 2010. On 4 November, he scored twice against FC Karpaty Lviv (4–0 home win) for that season's Europa League. The following week, he also found the net in two home fixtures, against Valencia CF (2–0, appearing as a second-half substitute) and Real Unión (6–1, in the round of 32 of the Copa del Rey).

On 8 August 2011, RCD Mallorca reached an agreement with Sevilla to buy Alfaro for five years and €700,000. He started in his first official match, a 1–0 win over RCD Espanyol.

Alfaro terminated his contract on 18 August 2014, and joined Super League Greece side Panathinaikos FC. The deal collapsed two days later, however, and he signed a two-year deal with Real Valladolid late in the month.

On 1 July 2016, after being sparingly used during his two-year tenure due to an ankle injury, Alfaro moved to Córdoba CF also of the second tier. On 23 July 2019, after suffering relegation, he agreed to a two-year contract at Segunda División B club Hércules CF.

Alfaro retired at the age of 33. In September 2020, he signed with CA Osasuna as a scout, having been offered this position by Braulio Vázquez and "Cata" Prieto, who worked as sporting directors and knew Alfaro from their time at Valladolid.

Personal life
Alfaro's two brothers were also footballers: Juan José (1981), a midfielder, graduated from FC Barcelona's La Masia, but spent his entire career in Segunda División B or lower. Forward Jesús appeared several seasons for Sevilla B, after emerging through the club's youth ranks.

Honours
Sevilla
Copa del Rey: 2006–07
UEFA Cup: 2006–07

References

External links

1986 births
Living people
Sportspeople from the Province of Huelva
Spanish footballers
Footballers from Andalusia
Association football wingers
Association football forwards
La Liga players
Segunda División players
Segunda División B players
Tercera División players
Sevilla Atlético players
Sevilla FC players
CD Tenerife players
RCD Mallorca players
Real Valladolid players
Córdoba CF players
Hércules CF players
CF Intercity players
UEFA Cup winning players
Spain under-21 international footballers